Reasons to Be Cheerful is the name of:
Reasons to Be Cheerful, a 2019 novel by Nina Stibbe
Reasons to Be Cheerful, a 2018 multimedia project including the album American Utopia by David Byrne
Reasons to Be Cheerful: The Life & Work of Barney Bubbles, a book about British graphic artist Barney Bubbles
 A 1999 short story by Greg Egan
Reasons to Be Cheerful, a politics podcast hosted by Ed Miliband and Geoff Lloyd

See also
"Reasons to be Cheerful, Part 3", a song by Ian Dury and The Blockheads